This article describes the qualifying phase for gymnastics at the 2016 Summer Olympics. Qualification was based on the results of the three world gymnastics championships (rhythmic, artistic and trampoline) held in autumn 2015, and Olympic Test Events held in early 2016 at the HSBC Arena. In addition, the Fédération Internationale de Gymnastique and the IOC Tripartite Commission for Gymnastics allocated places to ensure certain minimum levels of representation.

Summary
Sports men and women of the states in the table below qualified for the Olympics

* Artistic gymnastics, NOCs with 5 entered athletes may also enter the team competition.

Timeline

Artistic

Men's events

* NOC chose any team gymnast
** NOC chose between 2 gymnasts

Women's events

* NOC chose any team gymnast
** NOC chose between 2 gymnasts

Rhythmic

Individual all-around

Group all-around

Trampoline

Men's event

Women's event

References

External links
Artistic Gymnastics World Championships Glasgow 2015

Qualification
Qualification for the 2016 Summer Olympics